Baghela is a village in Nakodar in Jalandhar district of Punjab State, India. The village is administrated by Sarpanch an elected representative of the village as per Panchayati raj (India).

It is located 8.4 km from postal head office Mehatpur (Jalandhar), 52 km from Kapurthala, 52.9 km from district headquarter Jalandhar and 141 km from state capital Chandigarh.

Demography 
, The village has a total number of 318 houses and the population of 1822 of which 936 are males while 886 are females.  According to the report published by Census India in 2011, out of the total population of the village 925 people are from Schedule Caste and the village does not have any Schedule Tribe population so far.

Transport 
Nurmahal railway station is the nearest train station however, Phillaur Junction train station is 30 km away from the village. The village is 59 km away from domestic airport in Ludhiana and the nearest international airport is located in Chandigarh also Sri Guru Ram Dass Jee International Airport is the second nearest airport which is 130 km away in Amritsar.

See also
List of villages in India

References

External links 
 Tourism of Punjab
 Census of Punjab

Villages in Jalandhar district
Villages in Nakodar tehsil